The RAF Air Section 2 (AS2) was founded in 1972. Its brief was to investigate complaints of low flying by RAF aircraft by members of the general public. The brief was widened to include the investigation of UFO reports, sometime in 1979.

References

Bennett, Richard. UK Intelligence and Security Report, August 2003. AFI Research / Richard Bennett Media.
Usually EU webpage

Military units and formations of the Royal Air Force